Eight ships of the Royal Navy have been named HMS Ardent, whilst another two were planned:

  was a 64-gun third rate launched in 1764. She was captured by the French in 1779, but was recaptured in 1782 and renamed HMS Tiger. She was sold in 1784.
  was a 64-gun third rate launched in 1782. She caught fire and exploded near Corsica in 1794.
  was a 64-gun third rate launched in 1796. She was used for harbour service from 1812 and was broken up in 1824.
  was a wooden paddle sloop launched in 1841 and scrapped in 1865.
 HMS Ardent was to have been a wooden screw sloop, but she was renamed  before her launch in 1843. 
  was an  torpedo boat destroyer launched in 1894 and broken up in 1911.
  was an  destroyer launched in 1913 and sunk at the battle of Jutland in 1916.
  was an  destroyer launched in 1929 and sunk in 1940.
  was a Type 21 frigate launched in 1975 and sunk in 1982 during the Falklands War.

Battle honours
Camperdown 1791
Copenhagen 1801
Crimea 1854–55
Jutland 1916
Atlantic 1939–40
Norway 1940
Scharnhorst 1940
Falklands 1982

See also

References

Royal Navy ship names